Ropaži Municipality is a municipality in Vidzeme, Latvia. The municipality was formed in 2005 with the reorganization of Ropaži parish. The administrative centre is Ropaži. The population in 2020 was 6,835.

On 1 July 2021, Ropaži Municipality was enlarged when Garkalne Municipality, Stopiņi Municipality and Vangaži town were merged with it. The entire territory of Ropaži Municipality is defined by Latvian law as a part of the region of Vidzeme. 

The center of Ropaži is 36 km from Riga, the capital of Latvia. The Riga – Ērgļi railway, European route E67 (also known as Via Baltica), and the highways Riga – Lubāna and Ogre – Inčukalns pass through the territory of Ropaži municipality.

Statistics 
Territory: 322 km².

Population: 6.832 inhabitants.

As of 1 January 2002 the largest villages are:

Ropaži – 1900 inhabitants,
Zaķumuiža – 1221 inhabitants,
Silakrogs – 779 inhabitants,
Mucenieki – 689 inhabitants,
Tumšupe – 633 inhabitants,
Kākciems – 513 inhabitants,
Augšciems – 372 inhabitants.

History 

The territory of the Ropaži Municipality has been inhabited since the Stone Age – Neolithic era (3,000 years B.C.). 4 ancient cemeteries and stone objects have been discovered here.

The first written evidence of Ropaži and its inhabitants go back to 1205, when Henry of Livonia mentioned Ropaži in the Indriķis Chronicles. Ethnographer Augusts Bīlenšteins considered the inhabitants of the district to be Livs of the Daugava. In about 1320 the Livonian Order built a stone castle at Ropaži which served as the centre of the district administration. The castle was destroyed during the Livonian War in the 17th century.

In the 16th century one of the most important routes of Vidzeme led through Ropaži.

In the 18th century the baronial Berg family obtained Ropaži manor and carried out large construction works. The gardener Daniel Ebel formed one of the first garden parks of Latvia. In an area of 93,000 square metres 29 species of trees and bushes were planted.

In reports of 1736 we can find information about the education of children. In 1766 the parish school “Pārupes” was established. Two famous Latvians worked there: the writer and translator Augusts Kažoks, an adherent of "The New Current", and the poet Doku Atis.

On 18 August 1804 the clergyman C. von Walter described Professor Robertson’s flight from Riga to Ropaži in a hot-air balloon.

In 1855 Ropaži manor became the property of Baron Victor von Wolf. At the beginning of the 19th century the Ropaži manor burned down.

Ropaži was seriously affected by World War I and World War II. In 1949 over 150 inhabitants suffered in Soviet repressions.

In 1936 Ropaži 7–grade Primary School was built; in 1960 it was transformed into a secondary school.

In Ropaži are many significant cultural and natural features:
Kangari Hills – 65 m above sea level, and a restricted nature area of 6.72 km²
Lielkangari Marsh - 8.32 km²
Ancient cemetery – Stone Age

See also 
 Administrative divisions of Latvia (2009)

References 

 
Municipalities of Latvia
Vidzeme